The 10th International Indian Film Academy Awards (informally known as the Decadial IIFA Awards) were a major film awards ceremony honoring the best Bollywood films of 2008. The ceremony was held in The Venetian Macao, Macau from 11 June to 13 June 2009. The choice of Macau as host city was considered a well-planned decision, aimed at reducing tensions between India and China, as well as to end the "deadlock" between the two countries over the issue of exchange of cinema. The ceremony was hosted by Boman Irani, Ritesh Deshmukh and Lara Dutta.

IIFA completed 10 years of existence in 2009, giving awards to numerous prominent film personalities. In honour of this landmark, five special IIFA Awards were awarded that year, and these awards were collectively called as the IIFA Golden Decade Honors (also as the Artists of the Decade Awards).

Jodhaa Akbar led the ceremony with 16 nominations, followed by Ghajini with 10 nominations, and Race and Rock On!! with 9 nominations each.

Jodhaa Akbar won 10 awards, including Best Film, Best Director (for Ashutosh Gowariker) and Best Actor (for Hrithik Roshan), thus becoming the most-awarded film at the ceremony.

Choice of host city and venue

Usually, the decision of a host city for the forthcoming IIFA Award ceremony takes place in the first press conference in the host city itself. This rule was broken and the host city and venue for the 2009 edition of the awards was announced in Mumbai. Brand Ambassador of IIFA, Amitabh Bachchan, announced Macau as host city in an event in the JW Marriott Hotel. The venue was declared to be The Venetian Macao, one of the largest resorts in the world. Reportedly, Toronto (was later chosen as host for 2011) and Istanbul had also bid for the awards. The next award ceremony were announced to be held in Colombo, Sri Lanka in 2010.

Macau was once again hosted the 2013 IIFA Awards.

Winners and nominees
Winners are listed first and highlighted in boldface.

Popular awards

Musical awards

Backstage awards

Technical awards

Style Icon of the Year

 Female – Bipasha Basu
 Male – Hrithik Roshan

Lifetime Achievement Award

 Rajesh Khanna

Green Globe Honour

 Rahul Bose

IIFA Golden Decade Honour

Rakesh Roshan won Director of the Decade even though Sanjay Leela Bhansali had won the most IIFA Award for Best Director awards (Hum Dil De Chuke Sanam, Devdas and Black). If the year 2009 was counted, then Hrithik Roshan would have one more IIFA Award for Best Actor than Shahrukh Khan, for the films Kaho Naa... Pyaar Hai, Koi... Mil Gaya, Krrish and Jodhaa Akbar.

Special awards

Outstanding Achievement In International Cinema
 Aishwarya Rai Bachchan

Multiple nominations and awards

The following eleven films received multiple nominations:
 Sixteen: Jodhaa Akbar
 Ten: Ghajini
 Nine: Rock On!! and Race
 Seven: Dostana
 Five: A Wednesday!
 Four: Rab Ne Bana Di Jodi and Bachna Ae Haseeno
 Three: Fashion
 Two: Oye Lucky! Lucky Oye!

The following four films received multiple awards:
 Ten: Jodhaa Akbar
 Four: Ghajini
 Three:Rock On!!
 Two: Fashion,A Wednesday!,Race and Singh Is Kinng

References

Iifa Awards
IIFA awards